Zhongzhai, may refer to:

 Zhongzhai, Gansu, a rural town in Min County, Gansu, China
 Zhongzhai, Guizhou, a rural town in Zhijin County, Guizhou, China
 Zhongzhai, Hunan, a rural town in Xinhuang Dong Autonomous County, Hunan, China